Cynthia Cecilia González Saavedra (born 29 June 1992) is a Mexican badminton player. She won the women's doubles title at the 2010 Central American and Caribbean Games, and was part of the Mexican winning team at the Games in 2010 and 2018. González participated at the 2011 and 2015 Pan American Games.

Achievements

Pan Am Championships 
Mixed doubles

Central American and Caribbean Games 
Women's singles

Women's doubles

Mixed doubles

BWF International Challenge/Series 
Women's singles

Women's doubles

Mixed doubles

  BWF International Challenge tournament
  BWF International Series tournament
  BWF Future Series tournament

References

External links 
 

1992 births
Living people
Mexican female badminton players
Badminton players at the 2011 Pan American Games
Badminton players at the 2015 Pan American Games
Pan American Games competitors for Mexico
Competitors at the 2010 Central American and Caribbean Games
Competitors at the 2014 Central American and Caribbean Games
Competitors at the 2018 Central American and Caribbean Games
Central American and Caribbean Games gold medalists for Mexico
Central American and Caribbean Games silver medalists for Mexico
Central American and Caribbean Games bronze medalists for Mexico
Central American and Caribbean Games medalists in badminton
21st-century Mexican women